(lit. "grilled bread") refers to toast, usually prepared with grilled white bread, in both the Indonesian and Malay languages. The dish is a popular breakfast food as well as tea time snack in countries like Brunei, Indonesia, and Malaysia. Historically,  was grilled or toasted by using charcoal as a heat source in many communities throughout the region, though this practice has dwindled with the advent of modern technology.

Common spreads for  include sugar, margarine, butter, peanut butter, and kaya.

Variants

Indonesia

In Indonesia,  is usually prepared as a sandwich of grilled white bread with a filling, consumed both as a light breakfast and a common street food.  was developed during the era of Dutch colonial rule as a practical way to consume day-old bread; it was typically served with butter, condensed milk, or Dutch cheeses. After Indonesian independence,  became ubiquitous throughout Indonesia, as consumption of toast became a matter of taste for its people as opposed to the practicality of avoiding the wastage of stale bread. 

Malaysia
When prepared in this same manner, it is considered to be identical to the Singaporean kaya toast.

The city of Ipoh in Perak is known for its kopitiam establishments, where  accompanied with local tea or coffee beverages and a serving of half boiled eggs is a staple order during morning or afternoon tea. 

See also

 Kaya toast

References

Bruneian cuisine
Indonesian breads
Indonesian fusion cuisine
Malaysian breads
Malaysian cuisine
Street food in Indonesia